Punia Airport  is an airstrip serving the town of Punia, Maniema Province, Democratic Republic of the Congo.

See also

 Transport in the Democratic Republic of the Congo
 List of airports in the Democratic Republic of the Congo

References

External links
OpenStreetMap - Punia Airport
 OurAirports - Punia
 FallingRain - Punia

Airports in Maniema